Knockmorris is a townland in County Westmeath, Ireland.

Knockmorris is one of 10 townlands of the civil parish of Lackan in the barony of Corkaree in the Province of Leinster.

The neighbouring townlands are: Fulmort to the east and Leny to the west.

References

External links
Knockmorris at the IreAtlas Townland Data Base
Knockmorris at Townlands.ie
Knockmorris at Logainm.ie

Townlands of County Westmeath